Bootlegs & B-sides is a compilation studio album by American recording artist Ice Cube. It was released on November 22, 1994 via Priority Records.

Overview 
Bootlegs & B-sides is a collection of b-sides and remixes compiled from various Ice Cube 12"s, originally recorded between 1992-1994. It includes the remix of the hit single "Check Yo Self", originally on The Predator album, and its b-side "24 Wit' An L". Production-wise, much of the album is very similar to the Lethal Injection album.

The compilation contains Cube's usual barrage of fiery social commentary, such as on the track "My Skin Is My Sin" where he raps: "See you devils are all the same/ You'll gun down a congregation in Jesus' name/ Using me as a scapegoat, well cracker don't sleep/ Far from a goat, more like a black sheep/ Lamb of God, and its odd/ That Allah is a man that don't need a tan".

The oddly titled "D'Voidofpopniggafiedmegamix" (a title which is a reference to a character, Sir Nose D'Voidoffunk in a Parliament comic which appeared in their Funkentelechy Vs. the Placebo Syndrome album) is a mix of several tracks taken from Ice Cube's first four albums. The title could be considered a reference to D'voidoffunk from the P-Funk mythology.

Many of the song versions were later included on later remastered proper Ice Cube albums.

Track listing 

Sample credits
Track 2 contains elements from "More Bounce to the Ounce" by Zapp
Track 3 contains elements from "We Write the Songs" by Marley Marl
Track 4 contains elements from "The Show is Over" by Evelyn "Champagne" King
Track 5 contains elements from "Atomic Dog" by George Clinton
Track 6 contains elements from "The Message" by Grandmaster Flash and the Furious Five
Track 7 contains elements from "Hey What's That You Say" by Brother To Brother
Track 8 contains elements from "La Di Da Di" by Doug E. Fresh
Track 9 contains elements from "Ffun" by Con Funk Shun
Track 10 contains elements from "Let's Do It Again" by The Staple Singers, and "Sir Nose D'Voidofunk" by Parliament
Track 11 contains elements from "Sir Psycho Sexy" by Red Hot Chili Peppers, "I Gotcha" by Joe Tex, and "My Lovin' (You're Never Gonna Get It)" by En Vogue
Track 12 contains elements from "Help From My Friends" by Parlet
Track 13 contains elements from "The Message" by Grandmaster Flash and the Furious Five, "Bop Gun", "We Had to Tear This Motherfucker Up", "Steady Mobbin'", "Givin' Up the Nappy Dugout", "Jackin' for Beats", "No Vaseline", "Wicked", "A Gangsta's Fairytale", "Once Upon a Time in the Projects", "It Was a Good Day", "Who's the Mack", "You Know How We Do It" and "Get Off My Dick and Tell Yo Bitch to Come Here" by Ice Cube

Personnel

O'Shea Jackson – primary artist, vocals, producer (tracks: 3, 5, 6, 10), re-mixing (track 4)
Dedrick D'Mon Rolison – featured artist (track 2)
Andre "Drayz" Weston – featured artist (track 6)
Willie "Skoob" Hines – featured artist (track 6)
William Loshawn Calhoun Jr. – featured artist (track 9)
Joseph Johnson – vocals & producer (track 8)
Michael George Dean – vocals & keyboards (track 8)
Xavier "Mr. X" Thomas – vocals (track 12)
Shemen Tyler – vocals (track 12)
Stan "The Guitar Man" Jones – guitar (track 12)
Michael Keith Simmons – producer (tracks: 1, 2)
Victor Nathan Taylor – producer (tracks: 1, 2)
Quincy Delight Jones III – producer (track 4), re-mixing (track 12)
Larry Goodman – producer (track 5), re-mixing (track 2)
Derrick McDowell – producer (track 5), re-mixing (track 2)
Mark Jordan – producer (track 6)
Henrik Milling – producer (tracks: 7, 9)
Jesper Dahl – producer (track 7), co-producer (track 9)
Rasmus Berg – producer (track 7), co-producer (track 9)
Lasse Bavngaard – producer (track 7), co-producer (track 9)
Henrik Rasmussen – producer (track 7), co-producer (track 9)
Peter Nicholas Secher Kvaran – producer (track 7), co-producer (track 9)
Mr. Woody – producer (track 11)
Brian Gallow – producer (track 12)
John Moran – editor (track 8)
Rob Chiarelli – engineering & mixing (track 12)
Glenn "Gee-Swift" Aure – re-mixing (track 13)
Art Shoji – design
Ern Llamado – coordinator

Charts

Certifications

References

External links

Ice Cube albums
1994 compilation albums
Political hip hop albums
B-side compilation albums
G-funk compilation albums
Albums produced by Laylaw
Albums produced by DJ Pooh
Albums produced by N.O. Joe
Gangsta rap compilation albums
Albums produced by Quincy Jones III
Political music albums by American artists